The Bissagos Islands, also spelled Bijagós, are a group of about 88 islands and islets located in the Atlantic Ocean off the coast of Guinea-Bissau.

There is a high diversity of ecosystems: mangroves with intertidal zones, palm forests, dry and semi-dry forests, secondary and degraded forests, coastal savanna, sand banks and aquatic zones. The archipelago was declared a UNESCO Biosphere Reserve in 1996.

Demographics
The population is estimated at about 30,000 (2006) and the ethnic group Bissago predominates. It has a relatively youthful population due to high birth rates and low life expectancy.

Economy
The economy is largely rural, with many families living from subsistence farming and fishing. There is some tourist activity, mostly boat charters from neighboring Senegal. Lack of infrastructure and communication links prevent the development of the islands' tourism potential. Starting in the early 2000s, several of the islands began to be used as transit depots for narcotraffic, which is quickly changing the social and economic fabric of the islands.

History
In pre-European colonial times, the islands were central to the trade along the coast of West Africa and they built up a powerful navy.  In 1535, this enabled them to rout the Portuguese, who later built a fort on Bissao, which was abandoned in 1703. The islands were not formally annexed by Portugal until 1936.

The Bissagos were visited by  Austrian anthropologist and photographer Hugo Bernatzik in 1930–1931, who documented daily life among the Bidyogo people.

The London School of Hygiene and Tropical Medicine is conducting research into infectious diseases on the islands. Because they are so isolated there is less danger of contamination of the results than in other places.

Culture
Due to difficulties of communication with mainland Guinea-Bissau that persist to this day, the population has a considerable degree of autonomy and has shielded its ancestral culture from outside influence. The Bijago language is spoken along with Portuguese and creole.

Some authors argue that Bijago culture tends to be matriarchal,  with women managing the household, the economy, law, as well as initiating courtship (women choose their husbands and terminate the matrimony).  Other sources dispute this and suggest that  closer examination has revealed a fundamentally patriarchal society where women, in spite of their substantial participation in material production and important roles in social, political, and religious matter, remain essentially unequal to men. A 2016 study suggested that female status in Bijagos society was diminished during the slave trade era but has become more valued again in more recent times.

In 2012, a study by Bissau-Guinean sociologist Boaventura Santy  examined the social representations of the people of the island of Formosa Bijagó about possible threats from climate change.  The study concluded that for "the Bijagó the natural and the social are inextricably linked, to the extent that a crisis in the social system would have negative effects" on the natural system.  In particular, it was the lack of harmony between the community, ancestors and the supernatural world that was seen as  causing environmental dissonance.

Art

The Bissagos peoples produce many artifacts for daily use and ritual following a traditional iconography that is unique to their culture, and shows variations from island to island. Among the most striking Bidyogo art pieces are the portable ancestor shrines ("iran") and the zoomorphic masks representing cows ("vaca-bruta"), sharks, stingrays and, occasionally, other local animals.  Traditionally-decorated artifacts are also produced for "fanado" coming-of-age ceremonies (wood masks, spears, shields, headgear, bracelets), daily activities (fishing, agriculture) and personal use (stools, basketry, foodware). Its unique aesthetics make Bidyogo art easily distinctive from other African tribal arts.

Notable people
Benkos Biohó, Former African king who was shipped to Cartagena, Colombia during the slave trade but managed to escape and found the maroon village known as San Basilio de Palenque.

See also
 List of islands of Guinea-Bissau
 João Vieira and Poilão Marine National Park

References

Sources
"Bijagós Islands." Encyclopædia Britannica
 An article about the land and the people of Bijagós Archipelago
 TVEDTEN, Inge The Difficult Transition from Subsistence to Commercial Fishing. The Case of the Bijagbs of Guinea-Bissau. Pages 129 to 130 In VAN GINKEL, Rob and VERRIPS, Jojada (editors) MAST (Maritime Anthropological Studies) Vol. 3, No. 1 1990 Krips Repro, Meppel, The Netherlands.

External links
Saving Paradise: Bissagos Archipelago

 
Matriarchy
Ramsar sites in Guinea-Bissau
Atlantic islands of Guinea-Bissau
Freshwater ecoregions of Africa